The 1972–73 Michigan State Spartans men's basketball team represented Michigan State University in the 1972–73 NCAA Division I men's basketball season as members of the Big Ten Conference. They played their home games at Jenison Fieldhouse in East Lansing, Michigan and were coached by Gus Ganakas in his fourth year as head coach of the Spartans. They finished the season 13–11, 6–8 in Big Ten play to finish in a tie for sixth place.

Previous season 
The Spartans finished the 1971–72 season 13–11, 6–8 in Big Ten play to finish in a tie for fifth place.

Roster and statistics 

Source

Schedule and results 

|-
!colspan=9 style=| Regular season

Awards and honors
 Mike Robinson – All-Big Ten First Team

References 

Michigan State Spartans men's basketball seasons
Michigan State
Michigan State Spartans basketball
Michigan State Spartans basketball